is a 1988 adventure game for the Mark III/Master System. The game revolves around a dog-like alien creature and his family.

Gameplay
The game is controlled with a text-based interface with multiple commands. There are two different endings to the game in addition to an altered sequence and a definite game over situation. Places to visit include the airport, the park, and various homes.

This game has been translated into English by the Homebrew community and offered on American Sega Master System cartridges  under the title "The Story of Mio." "Story of Mio" is the subtitle for the original game.

References

External links

1988 video games
Adventure games
Master System games
Master System-only games
Japan-exclusive video games
Video games developed in Japan